Edmond Brazès (Céret (Pyrénées-Orientales), 1893 – 10 June 1980) was a French writer in both Catalan and French.

He worked as a barber and in his spare time, he wrote poems, tales, theatre plays and memories as a hobby. He worked for 40 years in the magazine La Tramontane.

Although he had not a high education, he became a well-known writer and was the secretary in the Floral Games of la Ginesta d'Or .

He took part in the foundation Roussillon's Catalan Studies Group (Grup Rossellonès d'Estudis Catalans, GREC). The publication Terra Nostra and the publishing company el Trabucaire published his complete work in 2003.

Works 
 La vie et l'oeuvre de Mossèn Esteve Caseponce (1948), essay
 L'ocell de les cireres (1957), poetry
 Històries del veïnat (1965), tale
 La neu (1970), play

1893 births
1980 deaths
People from Céret
Catalan-language writers
French male poets
20th-century French poets
20th-century French male writers